Isochilus aurantiacus is a species of orchid native to Mexico (Chiapas), south into Central America.

External links

aurantiacus
Orchids of Mexico
Orchids of Central America